Valley of Bones is a 2017 American adventure/crime thriller film directed by Dan Glaser and starring Autumn Reeser, Rhys Coiro and Steven Molony. Jon L. Wanzek of Bad Medicine Films was the writer, producer and executive producer. It was released in theaters on September 1, 2017 and received mixed reviews from critics.

Plot 
A disgraced paleontologist struggling to raise her son is tipped off to a groundbreaking dig site in the Badlands, embarks on a journey through the badlands of western North Dakota to search for a monumental T. rex fossil. She has to team up with a recovering meth addict, with unpaid debts to a drug cartel and threatens to bury them both under the weight of their criminal pasts.

Cast
Autumn Reeser as Anna
Rhys Coiro as Nate
Steven Molony as McCoy
Mason Mahay as Ezekiel
Alexandra Billings as Kimberly
Bill Smitrovich as Bill
Mark Margolis as El Papá
Muse Watson as Terry
Brandon Heitkamp as Bryce 
Van White as Reese
Maddisyn Carter as Julie

Production
Jon L. Wanzek of Bad Medicine Films was the writer, producer and executive producer, his first full independent feature film.
 Most of the film was shot on Wanzek's Pitchfork Ranch property near Amidon, North Dakota. Valley of Bones was distributed by Smith Global Media/Sony Pictures and released across the United States in September 2017.

References

External links
Official website

American thriller films
American adventure films
2010s thriller films
2010s adventure films
2017 films
Films set in North Dakota
Films shot in North Dakota
2010s English-language films
2010s American films